The shape of the so-called “thrown stones” has caught the curiosity of many travelers going to Rome. About a kilometer from the town of Bolsena, which leads to Montefiascone along the Cassia, you can observe a columnar basalt rock formation: naturally-formed prisms of volcanic rock.

Etymology 

The “thrown stones” the popular term, which is commonly referred to these particular rocks, was coined by the locals in an attempt to understand what seemed like an inexplicable phenomenon. People imagined that the volcano, that is now replaced by Lake Bolsena, had thrown stones during an eruption and that they had driven into the ground.

Morphology 
The morphology of this basaltic wall is due to the intense volcanic activity that affected the area one million years ago and in particular to the magma that came in contact with water, which has taken the form of a pentagonal or hexagonal rock column. In some cases the so-called "heads" of the basalts are not smooth, but have a rough surface due to melt conformations called "volcanic".

Legend 
A legend tells that the ancient gods had built the temple in a sacred place near the lake, which had prevented the priests from celebrating the rites and sacrifices in the unlucky days. But some priests didn't adhere to the divine. Thus the temple was violated. The fury of the gods was very violent and a series of lightning was thrown on the temple and the village nearby. But a brave girl, in order to save innocent people, reached the lake because she wanted to sink and die. The Almighty moved by the sacrifice of the girl, saved her from a lightning turning himself into a stone this way she didn't drown. The God, overcome by compassion, calmed its fury and turned every bolt launched on the temple into a series of stones stuck into the ground. The quiet came back then but the rites were celebrated following rigorous rules. The temple was destroyed and never rebuilt. The girl was recognized by all as the only Vestal of God and retired in a sacred cave located near the lake waters.

Note 
La Tuscia 

Velza Forum 

Comune di Bolsena 

Geography of Italy
Columnar basalts